M. chinensis  may refer to:
 Melaphis chinensis, the Chinese sumac aphid, an aphid species
 Morea chinensis, a synonym for Iris domestica, the blackberry lily, leopard flower or leopard lily, an ornamental plant species

See also
 Chinensis (disambiguation)